Melaz Gavaber (also Romanized as Melāz Gavāber; also known as Melāzgovāber) is a village in Otaqvar Rural District, Otaqvar District, Langarud County, Gilan Province, Iran. At the 2006 census, its population was 38, in 12 families.

References 

Populated places in Langarud County